The North American Soccer League (NASL) was the top-level major professional soccer league in the United States and Canada that operated from 1968 to 1984. It was the first soccer league to be successful on a national scale in the United States. The league final was called the Soccer Bowl from 1975 to 1983 and the Soccer Bowl Series in its final year, 1984. The league was headed by Commissioner Phil Woosnam from 1969 to 1983. The NASL laid the foundations for soccer (or association football) in the United States that helped lead to the country hosting the 1994 FIFA World Cup and the set-up of Major League Soccer (MLS) in 1996.

The United States did not have a truly national top-flight league until the FIFA-sanctioned United Soccer Association (USA) and the "outlaw" National Professional Soccer League (NPSL), which had a network television contract, merged in December 1967 to form the NASL. The NASL considered the two pre-merge forerunner leagues as part of its history. 

The league's popularity peaked in the late 1970s. The league averaged over 13,000 fans per game in each season from 1977 to 1983, and the league's matches were broadcast on network television from 1975 to 1980.
The league's most prominent team was the New York Cosmos. During the mid-to-late 1970s, the Cosmos signed a number of the world's best players —Pelé, Franz Beckenbauer, Carlos Alberto— and the Cosmos averaged over 28,000 fans for each season from 1977 to 1982 while having three seasons of the average attendance topping 40,000 spectators per game. Other internationally well-known players in the league included Giorgio Chinaglia, Johan Cruyff, Johan Neeskens, Gerd Müller, Bobby Moore, Eusébio, and George Best. However, over-expansion, the economic recession of the early 1980s, and disputes with the players union ultimately led to the collapse of the NASL following the 1984 season. Also, FIFA's decision to award the hosting of the 1986 FIFA World Cup to Mexico after Colombia withdrew, rather than the U.S., is considered a factor in the NASL's demise. Former New York Cosmos president Clive Toye called the league "a magnificent success that eventually failed as a single entity. But, what it left behind is a knowledge of the game that didn't even existed (sic) in this country before and enthusiasm for the game which never existed before."

The league additionally sanctioned indoor soccer in various tournament forms in 1971, 1975, 1976, 1978, 1979 and 1983, and in a season format in 1979–80, 1980–81, 1981–82 and 1983–84.

History

Founding

The surprisingly large North American TV audience of over 1 million for the 1966 FIFA World Cup and the resulting documentary film, Goal!, led American sports investors to believe there was an untapped market for the sport in the U.S. and Canada. In 1967, two professional soccer leagues started in the United States: the FIFA-sanctioned United Soccer Association (USA), which consisted of entire European and South American teams brought to the U.S. and given local names, and the unsanctioned "outlaw" National Professional Soccer League (NPSL). 
While the USA had FIFA sanction, the foreign teams which were rebranded as American for the summer 1967 season viewed the league as little more than a training exercise for their off-season, and most did not field their best players. The NPSL had a two-year national television contract in the U.S. with the CBS television network. Officials were instructed to whistle fouls and delay play to allow CBS to insert commercials. The ratings for matches were unacceptable even by weekend daytime standards and the arrangement with CBS was soon terminated. Bill MacPhail, head of CBS Sports, attributed NPSL's lack of TV appeal to empty stadiums with few fans, and to undistinguished foreign players who were unfamiliar to American soccer fans.

The two leagues merged on December 7, 1967, to form the North American Soccer League (NASL). NASL began the 1968 season with 17 of the 22 teams that had participated during the 1967 season, folding five redundant teams in cities where both USA and NPSL had operated. The teams relied mostly on foreign talent, including the Brazilian Vavá, one of the leading scorers of the 1958 and 1962 World Cups. International friendlies included victories against Pelé's Santos and against English champions Manchester City.

Though the league had a few successes, it experienced significant problems gaining acceptance in the American sports community. The 17 teams included only 30 North American players. The expenses of high salaries for foreign players and renting of large stadiums, coupled with low attendances, resulted in every team losing money in 1968, and investors quickly pulled the plug after their year's commitment ended.  At the end of the year, CBS pulled its TV contract, and all but five of the teams folded. The league moved its offices to a basement of Atlanta–Fulton County Stadium, and at the end of the sixteen-game 1969 season, the league declared Kansas City the league champions on the basis of most points in the round-robin, and the Baltimore Bays announced they would fold. It appeared top-tier professional soccer would not survive in North America.

Desperate to keep the league afloat, the league approached two American Soccer League teams, the Rochester Lancers and the Washington Darts about transferring to the NASL. Despite coming from the ASL (which had a nearly 40-year history as a semi-pro league), the two teams were immediately the most successful, and won their respective divisions. Rochester beat Washington in a two-game final, and the league survived.

In 1971, NASL added three teams—the New York Cosmos, Montreal Olympique, and the Toronto Metros—each of which paid a $25,000 expansion fee. The Dallas Tornado won the title after a number of multiple overtime playoff games, including a 173-minute marathon against Rochester.

Realizing it needed to sell to North Americans the sport of soccer, which was still foreign to most people, the NASL modified its game rules in an attempt to make its product more exciting, and comprehensible, to the average sports fan. These changes included the following:
Utilizing a clock that counted game time down to zero, as was typical of other timed American sports, rather than the traditional upwards direction to 90 minutes.
The introduction during the 1972 season of a line  from the goal to determine offside calls, rather than the usual midfield line.  Meant to increase scoring opportunities and reduce the frequency of defenses trapping an attacking player into an offside position, this rule allowed the attacker to no longer be offside unless he had crossed that 35-yard line.  Though it was ridiculed outside the NASL, the experiment did have FIFA's blessing until 1982.
The implementation in 1974 of a penalty shootout to decide matches that ended in a draw.  By the 1977 season the shootout was modified to somewhat resemble, in spirit at least, a penalty shot in ice hockey. The attacking player would start at the 35-yard line and attempt his shot within five seconds, but he could make as many breakaway moves as he could; likewise, the goalkeeper could take on the attacker without restriction. The format was best-of-5-kicks, with each team attempting extra rounds if the score was still tied after five rounds.
The carryover of the NPSL's 1967 points system, in which teams were awarded six points for a regulation (and later extra time) win, and initially three points for a draw. When the penalty shootout eliminated tie games in 1974, the winning team was awarded three points for a win rather than six; this was later reduced to one point in 1975–1976, raised to the traditional six points from 1977 to 1980, and reduced again to four points from 1981 to 1984.
The most notable variation on the points system that was also carried over from the NPSL was awarding a team a bonus point for each goal (up to a three-goal maximum) they scored in the game, regardless of its outcome. On five occasions this nontraditional system gave the regular season title to a team other than the one with the best record; this most notably occurred in 1983, when the Cosmos, buoyed by their league-leading 87 goals, were awarded the regular season title despite having two fewer wins than the Vancouver Whitecaps.

Interest begins to grow
The NASL of the early 1970s was, to a large extent, a semi-pro league, with many of the players holding other jobs.

On September 3, 1973, Sports Illustrated featured a soccer player on its cover for the first time – Philadelphia Atoms goalkeeper Bob Rigby. SI profiled the Philadelphia Atoms' victory in the NASL championship, the first time an American expansion sports team won a title in its first season. Philadelphia averaged 11,500 fans in 1973, the first time since 1967 that any North American professional soccer team had averaged over 10,000 fans. The cover title declared "Soccer Goes American", as Philadelphia had started six Americans in the championship match. Despite the "Soccer Goes American" title, however, in no season after 1974 did any American player win the MVP award or finish as league top scorer, as the mid-1970s saw an influx of foreign talent.
SI predicted continued success for the Philadelphia Atoms, but the Atoms dissolved in 1976.

NASL's average attendance had grown steadily from a low of 2,930 in 1969 to 7,770 in 1974, and by 1974 four teams were averaging over 10,000 attendance. The 1974 NASL Championship game between the Los Angeles Aztecs and the Miami Toros was televised live on CBS, the first national broadcast of a pro soccer match in the United States since 1968.

The 1974 and 1975 seasons saw rapid expansion for NASL. In 1974, eight new teams paid the $75,000 franchise fee (equivalent to $ in ) and joined the league, although two existing teams folded. The 1974 expansion saw teams on the west coast, giving NASL a national presence for the first time. The west coast expansion was a success, with three of the teams – San Jose, Seattle and Vancouver – averaging over 10,000 fans in 1974. In 1975, five more franchises were added. Two of these five additions – Chicago and Hartford – were in cities that had successful franchises in Division II American Soccer League, which at the time saw itself as a potential challenger to NASL as the U.S.'s top professional soccer league. The expansions of 1974 and 1975 meant that NASL had grown from 9 teams in 1973 to 20 teams by 1975.

The 1975 season saw the signing of internationally known players, including Portuguese star Eusébio to Boston, and former England goalkeeper Peter Bonetti to St. Louis.

Pelé and the New York Cosmos

In 1975, the New York Cosmos created a media sensation and overnight transformed the fortunes of soccer in the United States by signing Pelé. From the moment he signed his contract at the 21 Club on June 10, 1975, in front of a crush of ecstatic worldwide media, Pelé's every move was followed, bringing attention and credibility to soccer in America. The Cosmos' home attendance tripled in just half the season Pelé was there, and on the road the Cosmos also played in front of huge crowds that came to watch Pelé play.

Pelé's arrival resulted in greater TV exposure for the Cosmos and for the league overall. Ten million people tuned in to watch CBS' live broadcast of Pelé's debut match—a record American TV audience for soccer—with the Cosmos on June 15, 1975, against the Dallas Tornado at Downing Stadium in New York. CBS also televised another Cosmos match plus the 1975 Soccer Bowl championship match, and in 1976 ABC signed a contract to broadcast matches during the 1976 season. By 1976, NASL was being picked up by the mainstream media, with the sports pages of newspapers covering the league. The NASL was shown on the TVS network (a syndicated television service) during 1977 and 1978, although some games were tape delayed or not carried in certain markets.

The biggest club in the league and the organization's bellwether was the Cosmos, who drew upwards of 40,000 fans per game at their height, during the period that older soccer superstars, like Pelé of Brazil and Franz Beckenbauer of Germany, played for the club. Although both well past their prime by this stage of their careers, the two were considered to have previously been the best attacking/offensive (Pelé) and defensive (Beckenbauer) players in the world.

Giants Stadium sold out (73,000+) their 1978 Soccer Bowl win. However, the overall average attendance of the entire league never reached 15,000, with some clubs averaging less than 5,000.

Expansion and star players
The Los Angeles Aztecs signed Manchester United star George Best in 1976.  NASL had been trying to persuade Best to move to America and place him in a major media market, but once the New York Cosmos had signed Pelé, Los Angeles was the logical placement for Best. Best was traded to the Fort Lauderdale Strikers (a club based in the Miami area) in 1978, and in 1979 Los Angeles signed its next big star, Johan Cruyff. Cruyff was an instant success, doubling the team's attendance, and winning the league's MVP award.
L.A. also brought in a new head coach from 1979 to 1980, Rinus Michels, who had coached Ajax Amsterdam, Barcelona, and the Dutch national team, the man credited with the invention of the Dutch playing style of "Total Football" in the 1970s.

The Minnesota Kicks were established in 1976 and quickly became one of the league's more popular teams, drawing an average attendance of 23,120 fans per game in 1976 to the Metropolitan Stadium in a Minneapolis-Saint Paul suburb. The Kicks won their division four years in a row from 1976 to 1979, drawing over 23,000 fans in each of those four seasons (peaking at 32,775 in 1977).

After L.A., Cruyff then moved on to the Washington Diplomats. The Washington Diplomats had been purchased by Madison Square Garden Corp. and its chairman Sonny Werblin in October 1978. Cruyff's presence was a huge boost, as was Wim Jansen, a midfielder who had played for the Netherlands at the 1974 and 1978 World Cups. For the 1980 season, the Diplomats attendance was 19,205 spectators per match.

Despite NASL's apparent success, of NASL's 18 teams in 1977, six were considered franchises that needed to be relocated, bought out, or folded. A planning committee of owners issued a report recommending that NASL strengthen its existing teams, and limit expansion to two franchises for 1978, with one additional franchise per year for the following years. Despite this recommendation, NASL brought in six new teams at $3 million per team, raising the league's teams from 18 to 24 for the 1978 season.

San Diego Sockers President Jack Daley later described NASL's boom years of the late 1970s: "It became fashionable to chase the Cosmos. Everyone had to have a Pelé. Coaches went around the world on talent searches, forcing the prices up."
The Portland Timbers tripled their team payroll from 1979 to 1980 in an effort to keep up with the league average.

The league began a college draft in 1972 in an attempt to increase the number of U.S.- and Canadian-born players in the league. The foreign image of soccer was not helped, however, by a league that brought in many older, high-profile foreign players, and frequently left Americans on the bench. This effort was often doubly futile, as while many of the foreign players were perhaps "big names" in their home countries, almost none of them qualified as such in North America, and they quickly absorbed most of the available payroll, such as it was, which could have otherwise been used to pay North American players better. After the 1977 season, the team owners voted to mandate an increase in the number of North American players by limiting the number of non-North American players a team was permitted to have on the field at one time and reducing the total of non-citizens on a club's rosters to a total of 11 by 1984.   As of 1979, NASL rules required that each squad start two U.S. or Canadian players—often a goalkeeper and an outside defender—and that each 17-man roster carry six native players. The U.S. had lacked sufficient quality youth soccer programs in the 1950s, resulting in the dearth of U.S.-born talent in NASL in the 1970s. NASL suffered a minor blow with a players strike at the start of the 1979 season, but the strike was honored by only one third of the players and lasted only five days.

In 1980, the minimum number of U.S. and Canadian starters was raised to three. The 1980 season was referred to as "the year of the North American player" with a renewed emphasis on "native players." With the increased requirements for teams to field U.S. and Canadian players, demand for quality native players boomed, with Jim McAlister setting a transfer record for an American player at $200,000 (or $ in ).

With the end of the 1970s, NASL seemed poised for moderate success.  The 1979 season had seen attendance increase by 8%. ABC televised several matches during the 1979 and 1980 seasons. An apparent era of stability seemed to have arrived, with the 1980 season expecting no planned expansion, relocations or failed teams among its 24 franchises, and with most rosters remaining relatively stable.

FIFA disputes

The NASL was often in dispute with FIFA due to its rules changes. In April 1978, FIFA threatened the United States Soccer Federation with banning NASL players from playing international games, due to the unsanctioned soccer rule changes by the NASL.

Financial problems and contraction

At the close of the 1980 season, NASL's woes were beginning to mount, as NASL was feeling the effects of over-expansion, the economic recession, and disputes with the players union. In the early 1980s the U.S. economy went into the doldrums, with unemployment reaching 10.8% in 1982, its highest level since World War II. NASL's owners, who were losing money, were not immune from the broader economy.

Perhaps most troubling of all, NASL owners were spending sums on player salaries that could not be covered by league revenue.  Whereas NFL owners in 1980 were spending on average 40% of the team's budget on player salaries, NASL owners were averaging over 70% of their budget on player salaries. The Cosmos, in particular, owned by Warner Communications, were spending lavish sums on player salaries, and while other teams—such as Los Angeles, Jacksonville, Portland, Toronto, and Montreal—that were owned by major corporations could keep up with the Cosmos, owners without deep pockets could not keep pace with the spending levels. Owners spent millions on aging stars to try to match the success of the Cosmos and lost significant amounts of money in doing so.

Another headache for NASL was competition from the resurgent Major Indoor Soccer League. The MISL began during the 1978–79 season, grew quickly, and by the early 1980s MISL was averaging over 8,000 fans per game. MISL's growth meant that throughout the early 1980s the NASL and the MISL engaged in a bidding war for U.S.-based soccer players, putting further pressure on league salaries and heightening NASL's financial problems. In an effort to vie for MISL's expanding audiences, the NASL operated an indoor soccer league from 1979–80 to 1981–82 and in 1983–84.

As a result, the league ran a collective deficit in 1980 of about $30 million (or $ in ), with each team losing money. The San Diego Sockers lost $10 million from 1978 to 1983, and Tulsa lost $8 million from 1980 to 1983. The Washington Diplomats folded in November 1980, after owners MSG Corp. lost a rumored $5 million on the team in 1979 and 1980.

NASL had also decided to sell TV advertising locally, instead of recruiting national sponsors. During the 1980 offseason, the NASL Players' Association was in dispute with the league over projected payments for the indoor season, causing the players to file a lawsuit against the league.

The 1981 season was even worse for the league, with the league's 24 teams again running a collective deficit of $30 million (or $ in ) and every team losing money. Ted Turner's Atlanta Chiefs lost $7 million (or $ in ), the Minnesota Kicks lost $2.5 million (or $ in ), the Calgary Boomers lost over $2 million (or $ in ), and Lamar Hunt's Dallas Tornado had lost $1 million annually. 
At the close of the 1981 season five teams folded, with another two teams—the L.A. Aztecs and Minnesota Kicks—later folding during the 1981-82 offseason after failing to find buyers. NASL shrank from 21 teams to 14.

Many of these new owners were not soccer savvy, and once the perceived popularity started to decline, they got out as quickly as they got in.
Over-expansion without sufficient vetting of ownership groups was a huge factor in the death of the league. Once the league started growing, new franchises were awarded quickly, and it doubled in size in a few years, peaking at 24 teams. Many have suggested that cash-starved existing owners longed for their share of the expansion fee charged of new owners, even though Forbes Magazine reported this amount as being only $100,000.

Decline and demise

With the league declining rapidly in the early 1980s and losing many franchises, the NASL made several changes in an attempt to keep going. Phil Woosnam, who had served as NASL Commissioner since 1969 and had been a strong proponent of expansion during the 1970s, was removed by the league's 14 owners in April 1982 by a reported 11–3 vote. NASL tried to help bring the 1986 World Cup to the United States after Colombia withdrew from its commitment to host, but FIFA decided in 1983 to award the hosting of the 1986 FIFA World Cup to Mexico, rather than the U.S. In early 1984, NASL reached a collective bargaining agreement with the NASL Players Association that included a $825,000 salary cap to be achieved by annual 10% reductions, and a reduction in roster sizes from 28 to 19.

The league lasted until the 1984 NASL season with only nine teams taking the field. On March 28, 1985, the NASL suspended operations for the 1985 season, when only the Minnesota Strikers and Toronto Blizzard were interested in playing. At the time, the league planned to relaunch in 1986.

Of those final nine teams, the Chicago Sting, Minnesota Strikers, New York Cosmos, and San Diego Sockers joined the Major Indoor Soccer League for its 1984–85 season. The Tulsa Roughnecks independently played 11 matches in 1985, before suspending operations on July 17. The Golden Bay Earthquakes and Tampa Bay Rowdies managed to survive as independent franchises until they joined the WSA and AISA respectively. The Rowdies were the last surviving NASL franchise to play outdoor soccer, lasting until February 1994. The Sockers were the final league franchise to dissolve. They survived playing exclusively indoor soccer until 1996.

Heritage
After the United States' early elimination in 1982 World Cup qualifying, American manager Walt Chyzowych stated the NASL had failed to offer much of a foundation for his team, since the league had largely failed to develop American players. Canada fared better, coming a win short of qualification for the 1982 World Cup with a squad exclusively made up of NASL players. 
Although the NASL ultimately failed, it did introduce soccer to the North American sports scene on a large scale for the first time, and was a major contributing factor in soccer becoming one of the most popular sports among American youth. On July 4, 1988, FIFA awarded the hosting of the 1994 World Cup to the United States. NASL has also provided lessons for its successor Major League Soccer, which has taken precautions against such problems, particularly a philosophy of financial restraint (mainstream American sports, by the time of MLS' startup in 1996, had adopted financial restraint rules, which MLS adopted). American college and high school soccer still use some NASL-style rules (with shortened halves, although the time does stop for certain reasons).

18 of the 22 players on the Canadian squad at the 1986 World Cup were former NASL players. The United States did not have any former NASL players on their squad at the 1990 World Cup but had three on the 1994 team (Fernando Clavijo, Hugo Pérez and Roy Wegerle) and one on the 1998 team (Wegerle).

Several NASL team names have been reused by teams in later soccer leagues. Currently the Portland Timbers, San Jose Earthquakes, Seattle Sounders FC, and Vancouver Whitecaps FC are all successor teams in Major League Soccer. Four other well known names (New York Cosmos, Tampa Bay Rowdies, Fort Lauderdale Strikers, and Tulsa Roughnecks) have resurfaced in the new NASL and the USL, which are both Division II leagues. Two of the oldest derbies in North American professional soccer (Cascadia Cup and Fort Lauderdale–Tampa Bay) began in the NASL of the 1970s, and continue today via successor clubs.

NASL indoor

The NASL first staged an indoor tournament in 1971 at the St. Louis Arena with a $2,800 purse. After a couple of years of experimenting, including a three-city tour by the Red Army team from Moscow in 1974, the league again staged tournaments in 1975 and 1976. For many years Tampa Bay owner George W. Strawbridge, Jr. lobbied his fellow owners to start up a winter indoor season, but was repeatedly stone-walled by other owners. For several years, his Rowdies and several other teams used winter indoor "friendlies" as part of their training and build-up to the outdoor season. In the meantime, pressed by the rival Major Indoor Soccer League (MISL), which inaugurated play in 1978, two-day mini-tournaments like the Skelly Invitational and the NASL Budweiser Invitational were held with varying degrees of success. The NASL finally started a full indoor league schedule, a 12-game season with 10 teams, in 1979–80. For the 1980–81 season, the number of teams playing indoor soccer increased to 19 and the schedule grew to 18 games. The schedule remained at 18 games, but the teams participating decreased to 13 for the 1981–82 season. The league canceled the 1982–83 indoor season and three teams (Chicago, Golden Bay, and San Diego) played in the MISL for that season. Four other teams (Fort Lauderdale, Montreal, Tampa Bay and Tulsa) competed in a short NASL Grand Prix of Indoor Soccer Tournament in early 1983. The NASL indoor season returned for 1983–84 with only seven teams but a 32-game schedule.

NASL champions

By year

* Due to the NASL's nontraditional points system, in 1968, 1969, 1980, 1983 & 1984 the team with the best win–loss record did not win the regular season.
# The New York Cosmos dropped "New York" from its name for the 1977 and 1978 seasons, then returned to the full name.

By club

# The New York Cosmos dropped "New York" from its name for the 1977 and 1978 seasons, then returned to the full name.

NASL indoor champions

By year

By club

Teams

Outdoor season
Legend
 – existed before 1968 NASL formation.  – continued after 1984 NASL demise.  – existed before 1968 and after 1984

*Operated as Toronto Croatia from 1956 until they merged with the NASL's Toronto Metros in 1975, and then again after they sold out of the NASL in 1979.

Of the 67 teams that played in the NASL over the course of its 17 seasons, many represent relocated franchises, and a handful represent the same franchise in the same location with changed names such as the Apollos, Cosmos and Earthquakes. The total number of unique clubs was 43.

Teams that played indoor seasons or tournaments (1971, 1975–76, 1978–84)

Atlanta Chiefs   (1979–81)
Baltimore Comets (1975)
Boston Minutemen (1975–76)
Calgary Boomers (1980–81)
California Surf  (1979–81)
Chicago Sting  (1976, 1980–82, 1983–84)
Dallas Tornado  (1971, 1975–76, 1979, 1980–81)
Detroit Express    (1979–81)
Edmonton Drillers (1980–82)
Fort Lauderdale Strikers  (1979–81, 1983)
Golden Bay Earthquakes (1983–84)
Hartford Bicentennials (1975)
Houston Hurricane (1978)
Jacksonville Tea Men (1980–82)
Los Angeles Aztecs  (1975, 1979–81)
Memphis Rogues (1979–80)
Miami Toros (1975–76)
Minnesota Kicks  (1978–81)
Montreal Manic   (1981–82, 1983)
New England Tea Men (1979–80)
New York Cosmos    (1975, 1981–82, 1983–84)
Philadelphia Atoms (1975)
Portland Timbers (1980–82)
Rochester Lancers (1971, 1975–76)
St. Louis Stars (1971, 1975–76)
San Diego Jaws (1976)
San Diego Sockers (1980–82, 1983–84)
San Jose Earthquakes (1975–76, 1980–82)
Seattle Sounders  (1975, 1980–82) 
Tampa Bay Rowdies  (1975–76, 1979–84)
Toronto Blizzard (1980–82)
Toronto Metros-Croatia (1975–76)
Tulsa Roughnecks  (1978–84)
Vancouver Whitecaps (1975–76, 1980–82, 1983–84)
Washington Darts (1971)
Washington Diplomats (1975–76, 1978)

Commissioners
1967: Dick Walsh (USA) – After 18 years with the Los Angeles Dodgers, he was chosen to serve as commissioner of first the United Soccer Association (USA) in 1966, then the North American Soccer League (NASL), which resulted from the merger of the US and the National Professional Soccer League (NPSL) prior to the 1968 season. He served the NASL through its first full season, 1968, then returned to baseball. 
1967: Ken Macker (NPSL)
1968: Walsh and Macker co-commissioners
1969–83: Phil Woosnam – He is credited as an important factor in the development of the NASL, and had been a major figure in promoting the league and had secured TV contracts from CBS and ABC. He played a key role during 1970 in recruiting executives at Warner Communications to invest in an expansion team—the New York Cosmos. Woosnam oversaw the westward expansion of NASL in the early 1970s, establishing teams in Los Angeles, the Bay Area, Seattle, and Vancouver. However, he also guided the league into several poor business decisions, such as over-expansion to 24 teams, that led to team owners' significant financial losses. He was removed from his duties as commissioner of the NASL in 1983 following a vote of the club owners.
1983–84: Howard J. Samuels – His pioneering methods in the petrochemical industry and success in the then-niche household consumer market translated into posts as Vice President of the Mobil Oil Corporation, Commissioner of the North American Soccer League, and chairman to Elms Capital Management, Alexander Proudfoot PLC, and Communities in Schools. 
1984–85: Clive Toye (acting) – After the sudden death of Howard J. Samuels, Toye was appointed interim president of the NASL in December 1984. The league ceased operations early the following year.

Awards

Most Valuable Player, Rookie of the Year, Coach of the Year

Teams named after NASL teams
The Heritage Cup in Major League Soccer was developed as a way to remember the NASL's heritage by having teams named after NASL teams to participate for a special trophy.  Today, two MLS teams, San Jose and Seattle, play for this trophy, although Portland and Vancouver are both eligible for the trophy if they decide to participate in this derby. NASL clubs' names still active in some form today are listed in bold.

 Baltimore Bays (1972–1973)
 Baltimore Bays (1993–1998)
 Boston Tea Men
 Chicago Stingers
 Chicago Mustangs (2012–)
 DFW Tornados
 Detroit Express (1981–1983)
 East Bay FC Stompers – NPSL
 Edmonton Drillers (1996–2000)
 Edmonton Drillers (2007–2010)
 Florida Strikers – USISL
 Fort Lauderdale Strikers (1988–1994)
 Fort Lauderdale Strikers (1994–1997)
 Fort Lauderdale Strikers (2006–2016)
 Houston Hurricanes
 Houston Hurricanes FC
 Houston Stars (WPSL)
 Jomo Cosmos – National First Division
 Kaizer Chiefs FC – Premier Soccer League
 L.A. Wolves FC
 Las Vegas Quicksilver
 Maryland Bays
 Memphis Rogues – AISA & SISL
 New York Cosmos (2010)
 Philadelphia Atoms SC– ASL
 Philadelphia Fury – NISL
 Portland Timbers – WSL
 Portland Timbers – USL
 Portland Timbers – MLS
 Rochester Lady Lancers – UWS
 Rochester Lancers (2011–2015)
 Rochester Lancers – NPSL
 Santa Cruz Surf – USISL
 San Diego Sockers (2001–2004)
 San Diego Sockers (2009–)
 San Diego Surf – PASL
 San Jose Earthquakes – Heritage Cup (MLS)
 San Fernando Valley Quakes
 Seattle Sounders – USL
 Seattle Sounders FC – Heritage Cup (MLS)
 SoCal Surf – PDL
 South Florida Strikers – WPSL
 Tampa Bay Rowdies
 Toronto Blizzard (1986–1993)
 Toronto Falcons (NSL)
 Tulsa Roughnecks (1993–2000)
 Tulsa Roughnecks (1995) – W-League
 Tulsa Roughnecks FC (2015–2019) – USL (now called FC Tulsa)
 Vancouver Whitecaps – USL
 Vancouver Whitecaps FC – MLS
 Washington Diplomats (1988–1990)

Players

The NASL brought some of the world's best soccer players to the United States. The trend started early as players such as Vavá, Peter McParland, Rubén Marino Navarro, Co Prins and Juan Santisteban appeared in the league in 1968. However, after the Cosmos signed Pele in 1975, the number of famous names increased during the NASL's peak during the late 1970s and early 1980s. In fact, 20 of the 44 World Cup Best XI selections between 1966 and 1978 spent time in the NASL. At one time NASL squads fielded the captains of the past three World Cup-winning teams—Beckenbauer (1974), Alberto (1970), and Moore (1966). Of the European Footballer of the Year awards from 1965 to 1976, eight of the twelve awards—Eusébio (1965), Best (1968), Muller (1970), Cruyff (1971, '73, '74), Beckenbauer (1972, '76) —were given to players who went on to play in NASL. In addition, several players went on to greater acclaim after leaving the NASL, among them Peter Beardsley, Bruce Grobbelaar, Julio César Romero, Hugo Sánchez and Graeme Souness. Two players appeared in both the NASL and MLS, spanning a 12-year gap in North American professional soccer: Hugo Sánchez and Roy Wegerle.

Attendance

Yearly average attendance

*Cosmos dropped "New York" from name for 1977 and 1978 seasons

Single-game attendance records

The New York Cosmos hold 21 of the 24 top attendance records in NASL history. Of the 107 games involving NASL clubs that have drawn 40,000+ fans, 65 were Cosmos' home matches at Giants Stadium (excludes Soccer Bowl '78). The table below ranks teams by the number of 40,000+ crowds they attracted.

See also
List of American and Canadian soccer champions
North American Soccer League on television
Record attendances in United States club soccer
Soccer Bowl

References

External links
 The American Soccer History Archives
 NASL statistics on Steve Dimitry's Extinct Sports League
 NASL tribute site
 Complete Results from 1968–1984 on Soccer Stats

 
Sports leagues established in 1968
Sports leagues disestablished in 1984
1984 disestablishments
Defunct soccer leagues in the United States
Defunct indoor soccer leagues in the United States
Defunct soccer leagues in Canada
Defunct top level association football leagues in North America